The FIBA Oceania Championship for Women 1995 (also known as 1995  Oceania Olympic Qualification for Women) was the qualifying tournament of FIBA Oceania basketball for the 1996 Summer Olympics in Atlanta. The tournament was held in Sydney.  won its 6th Oceania Championship to qualify for the Olympics.

Results

References
FIBA Archive

FIBA Oceania Championship
Championship
1995 in New Zealand basketball
1995 in Australian basketball
International basketball competitions hosted by Australia
Australia women's national basketball team games
New Zealand women's national basketball team games